This is a list of schools in the City of Sunderland, Tyne and Wear, England.

State-funded schools

Primary schools

 Academy 360
 Albany Village Primary School
 Barmston Village Primary School
 Barnes Infant Academy
 Barnes Junior School
 Barnwell Academy
 Benedict Biscop CE Primary School
 Bernard Gilpin Primary School
 Bexhill Academy
 Biddick Primary School
 Blackfell Primary School
 Broadway Junior School
 Burnside Academy Inspires
 Castletown Primary School
 Christ's College
 Dame Dorothy Primary School
 Diamond Hall Infant Academy
 Diamond Hall Junior Academy
 Dubmire Primary
 Easington Lane Primary School
 East Herrington Primary Academy
 East Rainton Primary School
 English Martyrs' RC Primary School
 Eppleton Academy Primary School
 Farringdon Academy
 Fatfield Academy
 Fulwell Infant School Academy
 Fulwell Junior School
 George Washington Primary School
 Gillas Lane Primary Academy
 Grange Park Primary School
 Grangetown Primary School
 Grindon Infant School
 Hasting Hill Academy
 Hetton Lyons Primary School
 Hetton Primary School
 Highfield Academy
 Hill View Infant Academy
 Hill View Junior Academy
 Holley Park Academy
 Hudson Road Primary School
 Hylton Castle Primary School
 John F Kennedy Primary School
 Lambton Primary School
 Marlborough Primary School
 Mill Hill Primary School
 New Penshaw Academy
 New Silksworth Academy Infant
 New Silksworth Academy Junior
 Newbottle Primary Academy
 Northern Saints CE Academy
 Our Lady Queen of Peace RC Primary School
 Oxclose Primary Academy
 Plains Farm Academy
 Quarry View Primary School
 Redby Academy
 Richard Avenue Primary School
 Rickleton Primary School
 Ryhope Infant School Academy
 Ryhope Junior School
 St Anne's RC Primary School
 St Bede's RC Primary School
 St Benet's RC Primary School
 St Cuthbert's RC Primary School
 St John Bosco RC Primary School
 St John Boste RC Primary School
 St Joseph's RC Primary School, Sunderland
 St Joeseph's RC Primary School, Washington
 St Leonard's RC Primary School
 St Mary's RC Primary School
 St Michael's RC Primary School
 St Patrick's RC Primary School
 St Paul's CE Primary School
 Seaburn Dene Primary School
 Shiney Row Primary School
 South Hylton Primary Academy
 Southwick Community Primary School
 Springwell Village Primary School
 Thorney Close Primary School
 Town End Academy
 Usworth Colliery Primary School
 Valley Road Academy
 Wessington Primary School
 Willow Fields Community Primary School

Secondary schools

 Academy 360
 Biddick Academy
 Castle View Enterprise Academy
 Christ's College
 Farringdon Community Academy
 Hetton Academy
 Kepier School
 Monkwearmouth Academy
 Oxclose Community Academy
 Red House Academy
 St Aidan's Catholic Academy
 St Anthony's Girls' Catholic Academy
 St Robert of Newminster Catholic School
 Sandhill View Academy
 Southmoor Academy
 Thornhill Academy
 Venerable Bede Church of England Academy
 Washington Academy

Special and alternative schools

 Barbara Priestman Academy
 Beacon of Light School
 Columbia Grange School
 Harry Watts Academy
 The Link School
 North View Academy
 Portland Academy
 School Returners/Young Mums Provision
 Sunningdale School
 Trinity Academy New Bridge

Further education
 Sunderland College

Independent schools

Senior and all-through schools
Argyle House School

Special and alternative schools
Ashbrooke School
Hopespring Sunderland
Thornhill Park School

Further education
 ESPA College

Sunderland
Schools in the City of Sunderland
Lists of buildings and structures in Tyne and Wear